A hollow-base bullet is a firearm bullet with a pit or hollow in its base which expands  upon being fired, forcing the base to engage with the barrel grooves and obturating the bore more as the bullet travels through the barrel. Hollowing the base makes the bullet more front-heavy, which improves aerodynamic stability and accuracy.

History
Two men have been credited with the invention of the hollow-base bullet: Captain Claude-Étienne Minié of the French Army and William Greener. The initial reason for developing a hollow-base bullet was to improve usability and performance of muzzle-loading rifles using black powder propellant.

See also
 Hollow-point bullet
 Minié ball
 Tamisier
 Nessler ball

References

Notes

Bullets